The Islamic Action Organisation (IAO) is a Shia political party in Iraq. It was founded by religious cleric, grand Ayatollah Mohammed Taqi al-Modarresi in the 1960s, as the Message Movement, and in 1979, was changed to the Islamic Action organisation.

Sources

Profile from MER

Islamic political parties in Iraq
Political parties established in 1961
Shia Islamic political parties
1961 establishments in Iraq
Islamic organizations established in 1961